Sergey Nemtsanov (born 23 January 1959) is a Soviet diver. He competed at the 1976 Summer Olympics and the 1980 Summer Olympics.

References

1959 births
Living people
Soviet male divers
Olympic divers of the Soviet Union
Divers at the 1976 Summer Olympics
Divers at the 1980 Summer Olympics
Sportspeople from Sakhalin Oblast